The St Ives Bay Line is a  railway line from  to  in Cornwall, England, United Kingdom. It was opened in 1877, the last new  broad gauge passenger railway to be constructed in the country. Converted to standard gauge in 1892, it continues to operate as a community railway, carrying tourists as well as local passengers.

History

The St Ives Junction Railway applied for an Act of Parliament in 1845, but as the West Cornwall Railway’s Bill failed in its application for an Act at the same time, the St Ives company withdrew its proposal. A new Act was successfully applied for in 1873 to authorise a St Ives branch line as an extension of the West Cornwall Railway, although by that time this was controlled by the Great Western Railway. It was opened on 1 June 1877, the last new  broad gauge passenger railway route to be built in Britain. The last broad gauge train ran on Friday 20 May 1892; since the following Monday all trains have been standard gauge.

Although there was heavy traffic in fish in the early years, this declined during the first half of the twentieth century.

All the sidings were taken out of use at St Ives by 1966, by which time trains on the branch were operated by diesel multiple units. The line was proposed for closure in the Reshaping of British railways report which prompted it to be one of the lines featured in Flanders and Swann’s Slow Train, but it was reprieved by Minister of Transport Barbara Castle. This was given a large car park so that it could operate as a Park and Ride facility for St Ives. In June 2019, the Park and Ride facility was moved to St Erth and services at Lelant Saltings were reduced.

Route

The communities served by the route are: St Erth – Lelant – Carbis Bay – St Ives

The branch line is single track for its whole length with no passing places.  It runs alongside the Hayle estuary and then the sea coast and is promoted as a good place to see birds from the train. It has also been listed as one of the most picturesque railways in England.

After the line goes through a short cutting and underneath two road bridges which carry the A30 roundabout outside the station, the line follows the western side of the estuary past . Beyond Lelant railway station the line enters a cutting and climbs onto the sand dunes above Porth Kidney Sands on St Ives Bay, with the church of St Uny and Lelant golf course on the left; the church's cemetery was disturbed when the railway cut through the hill. The South West Coast Path crosses the line here and then follows close by all the way to St Ives. Soon after the line comes around the headland at Carrick Gladden and into . Perched on the hillside above the beach, this resort only developed after the railway arrived in 1877.

Services

The line initially saw just five trains a day, but by 1909 this had grown to nine and in 1965 it was 17 with up to 24 on summer Saturdays.  Some trains included through carriages from London Paddington station and in the 1950s the Cornish Riviera Express ran from St Ives through to Paddington on summer Saturdays.  The number of services continued to increase following the opening of Lelant Saltings and the summer of 2006 saw 26 daily services operated by Wessex Trains. Great Western Railway (train operating company) took over the operation later in the year and the winter timetable was reduced to 16 trains which caused some concern but the summer of 2007 saw a return to the previous service level.

As of August 2016, trains run at approximately 30-minute intervals in each direction for most of the day, including Sundays.

In the summer months when traffic levels are high, most services are now operated by 2 x two-car Class 150 sets, but in the winter a two-car Class 150 set is used. On particularly busy days additional sets are added; St Ives can handle six carriages but the bay platform at St Erth is long enough for just five.

As of May 2019, there continues to be trains running every 30 minutes. All these services call at Carbis Bay with trains serving Lelant mostly every two hours with some hourly gaps between services. Lelant Saltings is now served by just one train per day in each direction due to the relocation of the Park and Ride facility to St Erth.

Since the line has no passing loops and before May 2019, the average journey time along the full length of the line was just under 15 minutes, services on the line used to suffer from very short turnaround times (about 1 minute) at both St Erth and St Ives stations. As of May 2019, the journey time has decreased due to the majority of trains no longer stopping at Lelant Saltings. As a result, the turnaround time has been increased to roughly 4 minutes.

Signalling
Trains travelling towards St Ives are described as 'down trains' and those towards St Erth as 'up trains'. There are three public crossings on the line. 'Western Growers Crossing' is a crossing at St Erth which the signaller can see from the signal box. 'Towan Crossing' is a user-worked crossing north of Lelant, and there is a foot crossing at Hawke's Point as the line approaches Carbis Bay.

Community rail
The St Ives Bay Line is one of the railway lines supported by the Devon and Cornwall Rail Partnership, an organisation formed in 1991 to promote railway services in the area.  The line is promoted by many means such as regular timetable and scenic line guides, as well as leaflets highlighting leisure opportunities such as walking, birdwatching, and visiting country pubs.

The St Ives Bay Line rail ale trail was launched on 3 June 2005 to encourage rail travellers to visit pubs near the line.  Of the 14 participating pubs, five are in St Ives, one in Lelant, two close to Lelant Saltings, one near St Erth and five in Penzance  6, 10 or 14 stamps collected in the Rail Ale Trail leaflet entitle the participant to claim special St Ives Bay Line Rail Trail souvenir merchandise.

Wessex Trains gave Class 153 single-car DMU number 153329 a special blue livery with large coloured pictures promoting the line and named it St Ives Bay Line, although this has now been removed by First Great Western who now operate the line.

The branch was designated as a community railway line in July 2005, being one of seven pilots for the Department for Transport's Community Rail Development Strategy.  This aims to increase the number of passengers and reduce costs to make lightly used railways more economically sustainable.  Among its aims are a higher-frequency of service, to introduce local tickets and ticket vending machines, and public art on the stations promoting the line as the artistic gateway to St Ives.

Passenger volume

Since 2001 journeys on the St Ives Bay Line have increased by 68%.

References

Further reading

External links

Great Scenic Railways of Devon and Cornwall
British Railways Sectional Appendix for the St Ives Branch, 1 October 1960

Rail transport in Cornwall
Scenic railway lines in Devon and Cornwall
Community railway lines in England
Railway lines opened in 1877
Railway lines in South West England
7 ft gauge railways
Standard gauge railways in England
1877 establishments in England